Edwin Winans may refer to:

 Edwin B. Winans (general) (1869–1933), U.S. Army General
 Edwin B. Winans (politician) (1826–1894), Governor of Michigan

See also
Winans (disambiguation)